Ciergnon Castle, or the Royal Castle of Ciergnon (Château Royal de Ciergnon; Koninklijk kasteel van Ciergnon) is a residence and summer retreat of the Belgian Royal Family situated near the town of Ciergnon in the municipality of Houyet, province of Namur, Wallonia. The castle is a property of the Belgian Royal Trust.

History
The domain with its woods, river and vast hunting grounds was acquired in 1840 by King Leopold I of Belgium at the request of his spouse Queen Louise-Marie. At first a hunting lodge was erected on a beautiful terrace overlooking a deep forested valley. The present château was erected later by King Leopold II of Belgium. The edifice was designed by his court architect Alphonse Balat. Since then it has always served as a holiday retreat to the Royal Family. In 1960 it was the venue for the press presentation of King Baudouin's fiancé Dona Fabiola de Mora y Aragon.

More recently the children of Philippe, King of the Belgians, Princess Elisabeth, Duchess of Brabant, Prince Gabriel, Prince Emmanuel and Princess Eléonore were baptised in the chapel of the château.

The Royal Family also owned other castles in the direct vicinity of Ciergnon. Fenffe Castle is still in use as a holiday retreat by the royal family. Ardenne Castle was, according to the wish of King Leopold II, converted into a luxury hotel. It was closed after World War II and destroyed by fire in 1968.

See also

List of castles in Belgium

References
 Belgium Royal Family

Specific

Royal residences in Belgium
Ciergnon
Ciergnon